Douglas Conard Aagard (born October 19, 1954) is an American politician from Utah. A Republican, he was a member of the Utah State House, representing the state's 15th house district in Kaysville until his retirement in 2011. Prior to retiring, Aagard served as House majority leader following the resignation of Kevin Garn 

Aagard received his bachelor's degree from Brigham Young University.  He has an associate degree from Snow College and an MBA from Westminster College (Utah).

Aagard spent much of his career as a mortgage banker.

References

Living people
1954 births
Snow College alumni
Brigham Young University alumni
Members of the Utah House of Representatives
21st-century American politicians
People from Kaysville, Utah